Omer (lit. sheaf) is an affluent town in the Southern District of Israel, bordering Beersheba. It is located on Highway 60, between Beersheba and the Shoket Junction.

History 

Omer, originally known as Hevrona, was founded as a kibbutz in 1949. The early residents were demobilized Palmach soldiers. In 1951, it became a cooperative village known as Eilata. In 1953, it was re-established as a communal moshav by immigrants from Hungary and Romania and renamed Omer. The name is based on the offering of the first sheafs in Leviticus 23:10.

In 1957, residents of the ma'abarot in the vicinity moved to Omer. In 1962, it was renamed Tomer and became a neighborhood of Beersheba. Since 1974, it has been an independent town and suburb of Beersheba.

Pini Badash has served as mayor since 1990. Omer's jurisdiction is 20,126 dunams (~20.1 km²).

Economy
Omer is known for its high socio-economic ranking. It is one of four municipalities to score 10/10, along with Kfar Shmaryahu, Lehavim and Savyon.

Notable residents
Eviatar Banai, musician
Orna Banai, actress and comedian
Guy Barnea, Olympic swimmer
Roni Dalumi, singer
Mickey Edelstein, general 
Amir Ganiel, swimmer
Imri Ganiel, Olympic swimmer
Ziv Kalontarov, Olympic swimmer
Shaul Ladany, world-record-holding Olympic racewalker, Bergen-Belsen survivor, Munich Massacre survivor, and Professor of Industrial Engineering

References

External links
Official website

Former kibbutzim
Former moshavim
Local councils in Southern District (Israel)